Frank Pearce may refer to:

Frank Pearce (footballer) (1904–1969), Australian rules footballer
Frank Pearce (businessman), American video game executive
Frank Pearce (cricketer) (1869-1933), Jamaican cricketer
Frank Pearce (1870s pitcher) (1860–1926), American baseball pitcher for the 1876 Louisville Grays
Frank Pearce (1930s pitcher) (1905–1950), American baseball pitcher for the 1933–35 Philadelphia Phillies
Frank Pearce, tennis player in 1905 Wimbledon Championships – Men's Singles

See also
Franklin Pearce (disambiguation)
Frank Pierce (athlete) (1883–1908), American track and field athlete